Willy Ze'ev Berger was an Israeli footballer, who played for Maccabi Tel Aviv, Hapoel Tel Aviv, Maccabi Petah Tikva and Hakoah Tel Aviv and for Eretz Israel football team

Career

League football
Berger was born in Hungary and played football as youth, appearing for the national schoolboys team, where he was first played as goalkeeper, filling in for an injured teammate. Berger played as youth with 33 FC and MTK Hungaria and joined the first team of VAC. In 1927 Berger was contacted to play with Maccabi HaGibor Haifa on its tour if the USA, but eventually Berger was dropped from the tour and settled in Tiberias, where he played and coached the local Maccabi team. After several months, Berger was asked to join the newly reformed Hapoel Tel Aviv, to which he agreed. With Hapoel Tel Aviv he won the first Palestine Cup competition. Berger returned to Maccabi Tel Aviv the following season, and once again won the cup, scoring a goal in the final.

In 1930, Berger returned to Hapoel Tel Aviv and stayed with the club until 1937, winning two league championships and two cups. After 1937, Berger played with Maccabi Petah Tikva and Hakoah Tel Aviv, before retiring in 1950.

National team
Berger was picked as goalkeeper for the first national team, playing against Egypt in the 1934 World Cup qualification. The national team lost in Egypt 1–7, but Berger's performance was Praised.

Honours
League Championships (2):
 1933–34, 1934–35
Cup (4):
1928, 1934, 1937 (With Hapoel Tel Aviv); 1929 (with Maccabi Tel Aviv)
Magen Shimshon (2)
 1925, 1926 (With Maccabi Tel Aviv)

External links
 
Willy Berger Hapoel Wiki

References

1906 births
1986 deaths
Hungarian Jews
20th-century Israeli Jews
Jewish footballers
Israeli footballers
Mandatory Palestine footballers
Mandatory Palestine international footballers
Maccabi Tel Aviv F.C. players
Hapoel Tel Aviv F.C. players
Maccabi Petah Tikva F.C. players
Hakoah Tel Aviv F.C. players
Hungarian emigrants to Mandatory Palestine
Place of birth missing
Association football goalkeepers